Professor Fidelis Uzochukwu Okafor is an academic and is the current substantive vice chancellor of Anambra State University located in Uli, a town in Nigeria. He was appointed by the governor of Anambra State.

Early life and education
Born in 1950 at Onitsha, Okafor had his G.C.E at All Hallows Seminary, Onitsha in 1972. He had his B.A at Urban University, Rome in 1976. He had his Masters (1980) and PhD (1982) in Urban University, and Gregorian University in Rome .

Career
He worked as Lecturer II (1982–1984), Lecturer I (1984–1986), Senior Lecturer (1986–1997) before he rose to the post of a professor in 1997 at University of Nigeria.
He is the current Vice chancellor of Anambra State University although he has also served as provost in Nwafor Orizu College of Education, Nsugbe (2007–2010).

Publications
He has written books which Include Legal Positivism and the African Legal Tradition and Right and Law in Hobbes' Ethical and Political Theory.

Awards
He won the Japan Foundation best report award in 1994.

Affiliations
He is a member of Nigeria Philosophical Association, African Association of Ethnophilosophers, International Association of Orientalist.

References

1950 births
Living people
Vice-Chancellors of Nigerian universities
Pontifical Urban University alumni
Academic staff of the University of Nigeria
Philosophers of law